is a 1990 Japanese film directed by Kōhei Oguri and based on the novel by Toshio Shimao. It tells the story of a writer with a wandering eye and his jealous wife. The film was selected as the Japanese entry for the Best Foreign Language Film at the 63rd Academy Awards, but was not accepted as a nominee.

Cast
Keiko Matsuzaka as Miho (ミホ)
Ittoku Kishibe as Toshio (トシオ)
Midori Kiuchi as Kuniko (邦子)
Takenori Matsumura as Shin'ichi (伸一)
Yuri Chikamori as Maya (マヤ)
Akira Yamanouchi as Masagaro a.k.a. Oji (おじ)
Miyoko Nakamura as Riki a.k.a. Oba (おば)

Production
The film was partly shot on location in Kakeromajima, Amami Islands.

Awards
The Sting of Death won the FIPRESCI Prize and the Grand Prize of the Jury at the 1990 Cannes Film Festival where it was also nominated for the Golden Palm. In that year it also won the Hochi Film Award and the Nikkan Sports Film Award. In 1991 the film won the Award of the Japanese Academy, the Blue Ribbon Award, the Kinema Junpo Award and the Mainichi Film Concours.

See also
 List of submissions to the 63rd Academy Awards for Best Foreign Language Film
 List of Japanese submissions for the Academy Award for Best Foreign Language Film

References
 Gabriel, Philip. Mad Wives and Island Dreams: Shimao Toshio and the Margins of Japanese Literature. University of Hawaii Press, 1999. , 9780824820893.

Notes

External links

 

1990 films
1990 drama films
Films based on Japanese novels
1990s Japanese-language films
Films directed by Kôhei Oguri
Cannes Grand Prix winners
1990s Japanese films